Ramridge Park is a hamlet in the civil parish of The Pentons in the Test Valley district of Hampshire, England. It is in the civil parish of Penton Grafton.  Its nearest town is Andover, which lies approximately 3.75 miles (6 km) south-east from the hamlet.

Villages in Hampshire
Test Valley